Hockey Club Lokomotiv, also known as Lokomotiv Yaroslavl,  is a Russian professional ice hockey team, based in the city of Yaroslavl, playing in the top level Kontinental Hockey League (KHL). The name of the team is derived from its owner, Russian Railways, the national railroad operator.

On 7 September 2011, nearly the entire team perished in a plane crash. The team's flight to a game in Minsk crashed during takeoff, killing all of the team's roster (except forward Maxim Zyuzyakin, who was not on the flight), all coaching staff (except goaltending coach Jorma Valtonen, not on the flight) and four players from the Loko 9 juniors squad of the Minor Hockey League (MHL). The tragedy forced Lokomotiv Yaroslavl to cancel their participation in the 2011–12 KHL season.

History
The team has been known previously by several different names:

 YaMZ Yaroslavl (1959–1963)
 Trud Yaroslavl (1963–1964)
 Motor Yaroslavl (1964–1965)
 Torpedo Yaroslavl (1965–2000)
 Lokomotiv Yaroslavl (2000–present)

The team generally played in the Second League of the Class "A" group during the Soviet era, being promoted to the First League of Class "A" for the 1983–84 season. Known as Torpedo Yaroslavl at that time, the team enjoyed moderate success under head coach Sergei Alekseyevich Nikolaev. Never a powerful club during the Soviet era, the team became a consistent winner with the creation of the Russian Superleague (RSL) following the collapse of the Soviet Union, winning its first RSL championship in 1997 under coach Petr Vorobiev. The club moved from Avtodizel Arena to the new Arena 2000 early in the 2001–02 season, and won consecutive league championships in 2002 and 2003 under Czech head coach Vladimír Vujtek, Sr. Vujtek left the club after the 2002–03 season for a contract offer from rival Ak Bars Kazan. Lokomotiv has not been able to replicate its success since that time, but has remained a perennial contender in the RSL and then the later KHL.

2011 plane crash

On 7 September 2011, the Lokomotiv club was to travel to Minsk for its first game of the 2011–12 KHL season when the airplane that was carrying the team crashed following a botched take-off from Tunoshna Airport. Of the 45 passengers and crew on board, only flight engineer Alexander Sizov survived the crash. 26-year-old Lokomotiv forward Alexander Galimov, who had been with the team since 2004, was pulled out of the crash alive and conscious, but had burns to 80 percent of his body and died five days later in a hospital in Moscow.

Prior to the crash, the team played nine pre-season games, finishing with a 7–2 record. On 3 September 2011, in Lokomotiv's last pre-season game, at home against Torpedo, Galimov scored the team's last pre-crash goal in a 5–2 victory.

In the aftermath of the crash, KHL president Alexander Medvedev announced that a disaster draft would be held to allow Lokomotiv Yaroslavl to ice a team for the 2011–12 season. However, on 10 September 2011, the team announced its intention not to participate in the 2011–2012 KHL season, opting to play in the Supreme Hockey League (VHL) for one season before returning to the KHL.  Former coach Petr Vorobiev returned to the team as its head coach for the VHL season. Also, Lokomotiv Yaroslavl's squad for the following season would automatically be qualified for the KHL playoffs, and the club could request allowance to use more than six non-Russian players in the KHL squad.

The accident was the second plane crash in Russia involving a hockey team; in 1950, the entire VVS Moscow team was killed in an air disaster near Sverdlovsk (now Yekaterinburg).

2012–13 season
On 9 April 2012, Tom Rowe, formerly an assistant coach with the NHL's Carolina Hurricanes, signed on as the team's new head coach.

For the 2012–13 KHL season, Lokomotiv added former NHL players Viktor Kozlov, Niklas Hagman, Staffan Kronwall, Curtis Sanford, Sami Lepistö and Vitaly Vishnevskiy. Vishnevskiy previously played for the club from 2008 to 2010. Current NHL Defenseman Dmitri Kulikov signed on to play with Lokomotiv during the NHL lockout.

Season-by-season record
Note: GP = Games played, W = Wins, L = Losses, OTL = Overtime/shootout losses, Pts = Points, GF = Goals for, GA = Goals against

Players

Current roster

Honors

Champions
 Russian Superleague (3): 1997, 2002, 2003
 Minsk Cup (1): 2017
 Longi Kahoo Cup (3): 2010, 2011, 2017
 Junior tournament President Cup (Trinec) (1): 2016/2017

Runners-up
 Gagarin Cup (1): 2009
 Gagarin Cup (3): 2010, 2014, 2017
 Russian Superleague (1): 2008
 Russian Superleague (2): 1999, 2005
 IIHF Continental Cup (1): 2003
 Spengler Cup (1): 2003

References

External links

  

 
Ice hockey teams in Russia
Sport in Yaroslavl
Railway sports teams
Kontinental Hockey League teams
Ice hockey clubs established in 1959